The TCR Malaysia Touring Car Championship is a touring car racing series based in Malaysia.

History
It was announced by Motorsport Asia Limited, which also organizes the TCR Asia Series, that on October 10, 2018, the creation of TCR Malaysia for the beginning of the year 2019. The championship served as preparation for other championships as the TCR Asia. There are scheduled 3 rounds with 6 races all held at the Sepang International Circuit, in supporting of GT Masters/Formula 3 Asia Winter Series and Asian Le Mans Series.

Champions

References

External links

TCR Series
Auto racing series in Malaysia
2018 establishments in Malaysia